The Big River is a river in the Grey District, in the West Coast region of New Zealand's South Island. It is a tributary of the Grey River.

See also
List of rivers of New Zealand

References
Land Information New Zealand - Search for Place Names
 Topographic map

Grey District
Rivers of the West Coast, New Zealand
Rivers of New Zealand